The 1984 Air Force Falcons football team represented the United States Air Force Academy in the Western Athletic Conference (WAC) during the 1984 NCAA Division I-A football season. Led by first-year head coach Fisher DeBerry, Air Force played its home games at Falcon Stadium in Colorado Springs and finished the regular season at 7–4 (4–3 in WAC, third). The Falcons were again invited to the Independence Bowl and defeated Virginia Tech 23–7.

Previously the offensive coordinator, DeBerry was promoted in late December 1983, and was the Falcons' head coach for 23 seasons.

Schedule

Personnel

References

Air Force
Air Force Falcons football seasons
Independence Bowl champion seasons
Air Force Falcons football